USS San Joaquin (AKA-109) was a  whose keel was laid on 17 August 1945, eleven days after the atomic bombings of Hiroshima and Nagasaki which ended World War II. Further construction was cancelled on 27 August 1945.

References

External links
 51 Years of AKAs

 

Tolland-class attack cargo ships
San Joaquin County, California
Cancelled ships of the United States Navy